Get It On...Tonite is the fourth studio album by the American singer Montell Jordan. It was released by Def Jam Recordings's spin-off label Def Soul on November 9, 1999, in the United States. The production was by Jordan, Anthony "Shep" Crawford, and Jazz the Man. Another success, it peaked at number 32 on the US Billboard 200 and number 3 on the top R&B/Hip-Hop Albums. The title track found also found success on the Billboard charts, peaking at number 4 on the US Billboard Hot 100 and number 1 on the Hot R&B/Hip-Hop Singles & Tracks.

Track listing

Charts

Weekly charts

Year-end charts

Certifications

References

1999 albums
Montell Jordan albums
Def Jam Recordings albums